Beaver River was a federal electoral district represented in the House of Commons of Canada from 1988 to 1997.

It was located in the province of Alberta. This riding was created in 1987, and was first used in the federal election of 1988. It was abolished in 1996, with its area becoming part of Lakeland.

The 1989 by-election was won by the Reform Party of Canada.

Members of Parliament

Electoral history

See also 

 List of Canadian federal electoral districts
 Past Canadian electoral districts

References 

Former federal electoral districts of Alberta